The Banff longnose dace (Rhinichthys cataractae smithi) was a diminutive (about five cm. long) version of the eastern longnose dace, its range restricted to a small marsh fed by two hot springs on Sulphur Mountain in Banff National Park in Banff, Alberta.

The development of a popular thermal swimming pool at the Cave and Basin eventually led to pollution of the dace's habitat. Deliberate introduction of mosquitofish in the 1920s was followed by various tropical fish (and aquarium plants) which reproduce year-round in the marsh, while the Banff longnose dace only spawned once a year. The exotic fish also out-competed the dace for food and preyed on unhatched eggs. The few remaining Banff longnose dace hybridized with the Eastern longnose dace from the nearby Bow River. In 1981 a research study showed that the habitat destruction and the introduction of the non-native fish threatened the dace. It is hypothesized that this Banff subspecies' unique genetic structure was irreversibly mixed with another subspecies (termed introgressive hybridization), and by 1986 it had disappeared and was declared extinct in April 1987 by COSEWIC. Currently a study is underway to clarify the taxonomic classification of this putative subspecies.

See also
Banff Springs snail

References

Rhinichthys
Fish of North America becoming extinct since 1500
Fish described in 1916

Endemic fauna of Canada